Baa Baaro Rasika is a 2004 Indian Kannada-language romantic film directed by Dayal Padmanabhan and starring Sunil Raoh, Ramya Krishna and Ashitha in the lead roles. The songs were composed by Mahesh. The film was a box office success. 

The film was dubbed to Telugu as Vayasu Pilichindi and in Tamil as Vaa Manmadhan Vaa.

Synopsis
Film starts with a college campus. The beauty is, it ends right over there as that scene is of Sunil's last of his college life. So no boring classrooms and lobby heroes. Movie takes a turn towards love in Sunil's life and there enters heroine Ashita. Serious about his career, the hero starts hunting for a job. So no 'typical' love songs in parks and pubs! He gets a job under a misandrist (men hater) Ramya (Ramya Krishna). There enters the villain. But until the interval, you will be wondering who this villain is! Soon this men hater starts liking Sunil who is younger than her. So a lot of scope for romance and glamour! Trapped between two ladies, Sunil at last comes out of the trammel. Why Ramya becomes a misandrist is suspense until the end.

Cast
 Sunil Raoh as Vishwa
 Ramya Krishna as Ramya
 Ashitha as Sona
 Ramesh Bhat
 Vinayak Joshi
 Nagashekar
 Ganesh as Vishwa's friend
 A. S. Murthy as Channappa
 Vinayak Joshi
 Karthik Sharma

Soundtrack
All the songs are composed and scored by Mahesh.

References

External links 

2004 films
2000s Kannada-language films
Indian erotic romance films
Films directed by Dayal Padmanabhan